Arizona is a state in the United States of America.

Arizona may also refer to:

Places
Arizona, San Luis, Argentina
Arizona, Manitoba, Canada, a locality
Arizona, Atlántida, Honduras, a municipality
Arizona City, Arizona, United States a census-designated place
Arizona, Louisiana, United States, an unincorporated community
Arizona, Nebraska, United States, an unincorporated community
Arizona Township, Burt County, Nebraska, United States
793 Arizona, an asteroid

Former territorial designations
Arizona Department, a department of the Second Mexican Empire, immediately south of the territory, 1863–1867
Arizona Territory, a territory of the Confederate States, 1861–1865
Arizona Territory, a territory of the United States, 1863–1912

Ships
, launched 1859, served in the American Civil War
, a steam frigate launched in 1865 
, a battleship sunk in the attack on Pearl Harbor
SS Arizona, a British passenger liner and holder of the eastbound Atlantic Record in 1879

Films
Arizona (1913 film), silent film starring Robert Broderick
Arizona (1918 film), silent film featuring Douglas Fairbanks
Arizona (1931 film), starring John Wayne
Arizona (1940 film), starring Jean Arthur and William Holden
Arizona (2018 film), starring Danny McBride

Theatre
Arizona (play), an 1899 play written by Augustus Thomas

Music
Arizona (American band) (stylized as A R I Z O N A), American rock and electropop band from New Jersey
Arizona (British band), Eurodance musical project from England 
"Arizona" (song), a 1970 song by Mark Lindsay
"Arizona", a 1981 country and western hit by Rex Allen and Rex Allen, Jr. used as the Alternate State Anthem of Arizona; see state songs of Arizona
"Arizona", a song from the 1982 album Blackout by Scorpions
"Arizona", a track on the 2007 album Because of the Times by Kings of Leon
"Arizona", a song from the 2008 album Hold On Tight by Hey Monday
"Arizona", a song from the 2009 album The New Way Out by Rustic Overtones
"Arizona", a song from the 2009 album Reality Killed the Video Star by Robbie Williams

Other
Arizona (snake), a genus of snakes
Arizona (Lucky Luke), a Lucky Luke comic
Talbot Arizona, a car model based on the Peugeot 309
 Arizona Reid (born 1986), Israeli National League basketball player
Arizona Zervas (born 1995), American musician
Arizona, one of the main characters of the video game Them's Fightin' Herds.

See also
University of Arizona, a public research university located in Tucson, Arizona, United States
Arizona Wildcats, the athletic program of the University of Arizona
Arizona Beverage Company, a producer of tea drinks in the United States, the United Kingdom, Canada and Mexico